Bullina exquisita is a species of sea snail, a marine gastropod mollusc in the family Aplustridae, one of the families of bubble snails.  The shell of the species is pink with darker pink markings.

Description 
The maximum recorded shell length is 7.8 mm.

Habitat 
Minimum recorded depth is 91 m. Maximum recorded depth is 110 m.

References

External links
An image of the shell of this species

Gastropods described in 1955
Aplustridae
Molluscs of the United States